Preaching the "End-Time" Message is a rarities collection by American sludge metal band Eyehategod, released in May 2005. It contains three original studio tracks, recorded on March 10, 2005, as well as live songs and rare alternate versions. The album is available on CD, vinyl LP and picture disc, although only 500 copies were made for vinyl or picture disc. The album is dedicated to Dimebag Darrell and Danielle Marie Smith.

Track listing

The concert tracks 6 and 7 are taken from the Live in Tokyo DVD (Club Quattro, Tokyo, Japan, March 19, 2002).

References

Eyehategod albums
2005 compilation albums